USS Lovering (DE-39) was an  of the United States Navy during World War II. She was promptly sent off into the Pacific Ocean to protect convoys and other ships from Japanese submarines and fighter aircraft. She performed dangerous work in major battle areas and sailed home with three battle stars.

She was originally scheduled for transfer to Great Britain, was laid down as BDE-39 on 7 September 1942 by Puget Sound Navy Yard, Bremerton, Washington. Ordered retained for use by the Navy, she was named on 14 June 1943 and reclassified DE-39 on 16 June. Launched on 18 June 1943 by Miss J. Shannon, she commissioned on 11 September 1943.

Namesake
William Bacon Lovering was born on 3 August 1913 at Nahant, Massachusetts. He graduated from Harvard University and on 2 August 1940 enlisted in the United States Naval Reserve. Appointed a midshipman 22 November, in Illinois- Naval Reserve Midshipmen-s School, he was commissioned an Ensign on 28 February 1941 and assigned to the destroyer .

World War II Pacific Theatre operations 
Lovering began her 25 months of naval service with a coastal shakedown cruise and an intense training period operating with carriers, destroyers, and submarines. Departing San Francisco, California, on 4 December 1943, she arrived Pearl Harbor on 16 December. She departed four days later on an escort voyage to the Gilbert Islands. Arriving on 28 December she operated out of the Gilberts for the next six months. Sailing mainly from Tarawa, she performed numerous escort assignments to Kwajalein and Majuro in the nearby Marshall Islands after they were declared secure on 7 February 1944. Eniwetok became a terminus after its seizure on the 22nd.

Supporting the Invasion of Iwo Jima and the Ryukyus  
Returning to Pearl Harbor on 27 July, Lovering underwent a period in drydock and then served as a target and training vessel for submarines. She continued this duty after returning to the Marshall Islands on 19 September. Late in October she commenced a series of escort missions to Saipan and Guam in the Marianas. These concluded on 10 March 1945 when, having steamed to Ulithi, she began her final assignment as a screening and escort vessel for logistic support groups of the variously designated 3rd and 5th Fleets. The Iwo Jima and Ryukyus invasion areas were her main theaters of action before departing for home on 9 July.

Post-War Decommissioning  
Lovering arrived San Pedro, Los Angeles, on 28 July. Her overhaul was prematurely halted on 17 August. Towed to Terminal Island, California, on 6 September, she decommissioned on 16 October. Struck from the Naval Vessel Register on 1 November 1945, she was sold to Hugo Neu of New York City on the last day of 1946.

Awards

References

External links

 
 

Evarts-class destroyer escorts
Ships built in Bremerton, Washington
1943 ships
World War II frigates and destroyer escorts of the United States